Schoonmaker Ridge is a jagged ridge, 4.5 nautical miles (8 km) long, that runs east from the south part of Reeves Plateau, Cook Mountains. Named by Advisory Committee on Antarctic Names (US-ACAN) after remote sensing scientist James W. (Bill) Schoonmaker, Jr., topographic engineer, United States Geological Survey (USGS). He spent three austral summers in Antarctica, 1972–76, with geodetic work at South Pole, Byrd Station, Antarctic Peninsula, Ellsworth Mountains and Ross Ice Shelf, where he determined the precise location of geophysical sites established during the Ross Ice Shelf Project, 1973-74 field season.

Ridges of the Ross Dependency
Hillary Coast